Juan Gálvez (Buenos Aires, 14 February 1916 – 3 March 1963 in Olavarría) was an Argentine racing driver, and the brother of driver Oscar Alfredo Gálvez. They started racing together in Turismo Carretera but then took separate ways and competed in different cars. He made his debut in the Avellaneda Automobile Club 1000-Mile race on 14 February 1941 and finished second to Juan Manuel Fangio. His first win came on 22 February 1949 at the I Vuelta de Santa Fe. He won the Turismo Carretera championship nine times, in 1949, 1950, 1951, 1952, 1955, 1956, 1957, 1958 and 1961. His last victory was at the IV Vuelta de Laboulaye (1962) behind the wheel of a Ford. He was killed during an accident at Olavarría race in 1963. In 13 years of motorsport he competed in 153 races, winning more than 50 times.

See also

Autódromo Juan y Oscar Gálvez

Racing drivers from Buenos Aires
1916 births
1963 deaths
Racing drivers who died while racing
Argentine racing drivers
Turismo Carretera drivers
Sport deaths in Argentina
Burials at La Chacarita Cemetery